Stephanie Edwards, M.D. is a fictional character from the medical drama television series Grey's Anatomy, which airs on the American Broadcasting Company (ABC) in the United States. The character was created by series producer Shonda Rhimes, and was portrayed by actress Jerrika Hinton from 2012 to 2017. Introduced as a surgical intern at the fictional Seattle Grace Mercy West Hospital, later renamed Grey Sloan Memorial Hospital, Stephanie works her way up to resident level with fellow intern and friend, Jo Wilson (Camilla Luddington).

The character was described by Hinton as "innovative" who strives to be the best. The love rectangle between Jackson Avery (Jesse Williams), April Kepner   (Sarah Drew) and Matthew Taylor (Justin Bruening) and herself, her relationship with neurosurgeon mentor Amelia Shepherd (Caterina Scorsone), her friendship with Jo, her childhood illness as well as her struggles with burnout have been focal points of her character.

Background
Stephanie was born with sickle-cell disease. At the age of five, she was put in a clinical trial at St. Jude that used bone marrow transplants to treat the disease. The treatment was very effective for her and Dr. Keith Wagner, who ran the study, called Stephanie one of the most successful stories from the trial. Her memory of the trial is resisting and being told it was for her own good. There were even times when they had to strap her down to get her to accept the treatment. She cried everyday and became depressed. As a result of her non-existent childhood, Stephanie ultimately clung to books and used this as inspiration to pursue a career in medicine as a doctor. In high school, Stephanie was a cheerleading captain and led her team to victory. She went to college on a cheerleading scholarship.

Storylines

Stephanie starts her internship at Seattle Grace Mercy West after the plane crash. She and the other interns come to fear Meredith Grey (Ellen Pompeo) and refer to her as "Medusa". While working on the case of Graham Cunningham, Cristina Yang (Sandra Oh) allows Stephanie the opportunity to do a procedure, even saying that Stephanie is better than Shane. When Bailey steps in, Cristina backs off, but ultimately decides to let Stephanie close, over Bailey's objections. While competing with Leah while they are both on Cristina's service, they both are indefinitely banned from the OR when their fighting led to Leah hooking up a patient's oxygen to her IV, a potentially fatal mistake. When it seems like the hospital is going to be sold, Stephanie starts looking at programs at other hospitals because she wants to be the best and to be the best, she has to learn at the best program.

In the tenth season, Heather dies and Stephanie is given time off like the other interns to grieve. She gets eye surgery after she feels her glasses got annoying. Later, Stephanie works on Meredith's portal vein trial. Stephanie sides with Alex Karev (Justin Chambers) in surgery over Meredith and Meredith decides she does not want to work with her anymore. Stephanie is invited to April Kepner (Sarah Drew)'s wedding. She questions the logic of her not inviting Jackson and questions whether they're not truly over each other. Jackson assures her otherwise, but tells April he loves her at the wedding, humiliating her in front of everyone. Jackson later apologizes after he is married to April. Stephanie works with Miranda Bailey (Chandra Wilson) on a case of SCID. The patient Braden Morrin's parents consent to them using deactivated HIV as a vector to deliver an enzyme to his body, but before the procedure is done, his mother withdraws consent. Despite this, Bailey proceeds with the procedure, because she knows he won't get better without any treatment, contrary to the belief of his parents. When Braden's t-cell count jumps overnight, Stephanie confronts  Bailey about it and Bailey confirms to her that she had done the treatment without consent. When Bailey comes clean to the parents, Bailey and Stephanie are both involved in legal meetings. When the parents announce their intent to sue and get Bailey's medical license revoked as well as charging her with assault and battery, Stephanie takes the blame, saying that she didn't tell Bailey that the parents had revoked consent and Bailey was covering for her. They drop the charges and Stephanie is suspended for a week.

In the eleventh season, Stephanie finds a mentor in Amelia Shepherd (Caterina Scorsone) as she becomes highly interested in neurosurgery. Edwards is forced to give April and Jackson the news that their baby will die. Amelia and Stephanie make it their mission to remove Nicole Herman (Geena Davis)'s seemingly impossible tumour. Amelia manages to remove the tumor, but after several days, Dr. Herman still does not wake up. Stephanie figures out that Dr. Herman had a small stroke, but luckily Dr. Herman eventually wakes up, but is completely blind. Amelia instructs Stephanie to live on the high and not beat herself up, as they beat the impossible. She finishes by declaring themselves "superheroes". Stephanie tries her hardest to make her patient remember the pilot with whom she fell in love with in a plane crash.

In the twelfth season, Stephanie must help a patient recover from brain surgery, which brings back bad memories from her childhood of when she was a sickle-cell experiment participant. Jo accuses Stephanie of lying about her disease, and tries to get Stephanie in trouble with Amelia. Stephanie confronts Jo at Meredith's party after Jo gives a misguided apology, saying she can't take the fact that she is better than her at the job and tells her to deal with her shortcomings, as Jo used her sick past as a "reason" for her hyper-competence. Jo is left speechless by this. Stephanie later deals with a group of cheerleaders in the hospital. A patient named Kyle comes into the hospital and begins flirting with Stephanie. They eventually become a couple. Meredith teases Stephanie about her new love interest, Kyle, after Stephanie accidentally sends Meredith an explicit text meant for him. Stephanie is kicked off Kyle’s case when Amelia finds out that they’re a couple. Not being able to operate leads to her breaking up with him. She thinks breaking up with Kyle was a mistake and almost calls him while drunk. Later, she learns Kyle is back in the hospital with suspected meningitis, chose not to tell her and angrily refuses to let her be involved. Stephanie and Kyle reconcile, right before Amelia is unable to save his life in surgery.

In the thirteenth season, Stephanie is surprised by Leah's return. Stephanie and Alex go against the wishes of religious parents who do not want to treat their sick child. Stephanie has an argument with the father, trying to tell him that if anything, God delivered Liam safely for them to treat him, but the father exclaims that she will burn in Hell. She lashes out and throws a tablet at the wall near the father. Eliza Minnick gets Stephanie's privileges revoked and she goes into therapy. Stephanie returns from therapy earlier after only 3 sessions, but ends up being a hostage to a dangerous patient named Keith who raped another patient. He holds a scalpel to her throat, demanding to escape the hospital. Stephanie is unable to evacuate with him due to a lockdown by Bailey to find them. Keith decides to light a fire to escape. While he’s distracted trying to get the flames close enough to set off the sprinklers, Edwards makes a move and douses him in the remaining alcohol and sets him on fire. Edwards grabs the little girl with them, and they get to safety in a room off the hall, but then she sees the man is dangerously close to a flammable cylinder. She warns the little girl to stay put and runs out to try and prevent it, but she is not fast enough and an explosion occurs, with Edwards' fate hanging in the balance. She manages to escape the fire, and saves Erin's life, but suffers significant burns. After saving Erin's life, she collapses. While getting treatment, she quits her job to explore and travel, and thanks Webber for changing her life, but she needs to move on to see the outside of a hospital as it was her whole life.

Development

Casting & Creation
Hinton was cast in 2012 as the role of Stephanie Edwards. The episode's initial script read-through took place on July 16, 2012. In 2016, Hinton was poised to exit to star in an ABC pilot series Toast but it was passed on and she returned as a regular in season thirteen.  On January 31, 2017, it was announced Hinton would depart after the thirteenth season ends after being cast in Alan Ball's new untitled HBO series.

Characterization

After Jackson professes his love for April at her wedding sitting next to Stephanie, Hinton described it as the "worst kind of betrayal. It’s one thing to say, ‘I’ve been harboring these feelings and I thought I dealt with them but I haven’t and I’m actually involving you in this decision.’ But it’s another thing to devastate someone in such a public way in front of people that she has to work with the very next day."

Hinton expressed enthusiasm for being a part of the storyline involving Dr. Nicole Herman's tumour with neurosurgeon mentor, Amelia Shepherd (Caterina Scorsone) in the eleventh season. Hinton said, "It's been a while since I've been this excited because playing the jilted lover, that was something, but now I get to sink my teeth into something! And I love when I get to do research, and the things that Stephanie is involved with now…somehow or another Grey Sloan is always the place with groundbreaking medical discoveries." Hinton elaborated further on Stephanie's journey in her first 3 years saying, "She got to be a part of Meredith's (Ellen Pompeo) 3D printing lab, she got to be a part of Bailey's (Chandra Wilson) genome project, and now she's going to get to be a part of this third gigantic thing."

Hinton spoke to The Hollywood Reporter about Stephanie's relationship with Kyle in the twelfth season. On Stephanie's decision to end the relationship, Hinton said, "She has to let it go and walk away because of the pure reality of the situation: Kyle came to her as a sick person and while they were able to mitigate some of that, the circumstances of his illness mean that he will continue to deteriorate, which means he'll continue to require more care. For a person like Stephanie, she is so driven and so young. This is the logic of a younger person. She doesn't have the capacity to give Kyle what he needs. Even in this week's episode, we see Stephanie try: He's sick and she brings him into the hospital and does the thing she knows how to do — medicine. She tries to do the thing she knows how to do and she's stopped at every turn because her superior says she's too close to this case. "This is personal and you can't keep apart the personal and the professional here, so I'm moving you off this." That's a devastating blow for someone who always thinks that she knows the right way. Granted, she trained under a fantastic mentor [Amelia] and she does know the right way to do things. So to be told, "You are not capable," is devastating. That will continue to be the uphill battle she fights, both in trying to carve out her career aside from Kyle and even more so in the relationship with him. She's not capable of doing both; she just can't. So she chooses her career. Let's also point out that it's not like they've been dating for a year; they've been together for maybe six weeks. She's considering every bit of reality at her disposal. And it's not an easy decision."

Reception
After the airing of the ninth season, Natalie Abrams for TV Guide assessed the 5 new interns introduced and whether to get rid of them or not. Judging Stephanie, Abrams assessed, "Keep her for now", and suggested to get rid of Jo and Shane instead. Speaking further, Abrams said, "She has seamlessly been able to infiltrate the core group by... well, sleeping with one of them. Her fling with Jackson (Jesse Williams) has been a fun storyline that recalls the early days when [Meredith and Cristina] sleeping with their own attendings. [...] [she] could [...] fall victim to being the other woman [with Jackson and April]. But that potential storyline could be a fun respite from a season otherwise dominated by the sale of the hospital."

In the twelfth season, Caroline Siede for The A.V. Club felt that "Without a love-interest or a trusted mentor, Stephanie is a bit un-moored at the moment. And on a show all about interconnectivity, that will hopefully allow her to stir things up a bit." Siede praised Stephanie and Kyle's (Wilmer Valderrama) break-up as well as Hinton's portrayal later in the episode “You’re Gonna Need Someone On Your Side”. She assessed: "In her final conversation with Jo she explains that after spending so much time as a helpless patient when she was a kid, she took control of her life by forging a new identity as a doctor. Going back to that “patient” (or in this case, patient’s loved one) identity is too painful for her [...] even though I wasn’t particularly invested in their relationship beforehand, I was unexpectedly moved by their breakup. There’s something selfish about Stephanie’s decision to walk away, but I can also completely understand her rationale. Selling the audience on both a relationship and its breakup is a pretty impressive feat for one episode to pull off and Jerrika Hinton deserves a lion’s share of the credit for that." Writing for "At Last", Siede was disappointed that the relationship between Kyle and Stephanie wasn't explored more but enjoyed the chemistry between the characters, as well as the tragedy of his death. She noted the "quiet dignity to Stephanie’s grief that I’m excited to see Hinton explore in the future."

Gwen Inhat, writing for The A.V. Club praised the character in her notes for "True Colors" questioned, "Is Stephanie alive or dead? Since Jerrika Hinton is moving on, I wouldn’t put anything past this show. But if Stephanie goes down a hero, that was an awesome way to go. Will really miss that actress and character." Lauren Hoffman for Cosmopolitan felt the scenes involving Stephanie being a hostage and getting into an explosion were "wildly over the top, but it's the first time I've felt true, scary suspense during a Grey's episode in a really long time". Maggie Fremont for Vulture assessed the episode saying, "if I shed any tears during “True Colors,” they were out of fear for Stephanie’s safety as Keith dragged her around a mystifyingly empty hospital. That got real."

In the thirteenth season finale, Hinton made her final appearance as Edwards. Inhat for The A.V. Club assessed that her absence would be felt. Maggie Fremont for Vulture said, "it’s tough to bid farewell to one of the show’s best characters, especially one who didn’t always get her due. Both Stephanie and Jerrika will be missed." Justin Kirkland for Entertainment Weekly felt that "Stephanie Edwards is possibly in the top three most tragic Grey’s Anatomy characters of all time. Think about it — left by her boyfriend at a wedding, lost her boyfriend (and then was given essentially zero plot time to assess that loss), did the heavy lifting for a surgeon who was in crisis during one of her most important surgeries (shout out to Dr. Herman), and here we are, presumably dealing with our natural-haired, crazy-talented, third-wave intern star lying somewhere next to a rapist, crisp as they come. Oh, Stephanie. You deserved better." On a more critical note, Lauren Hoffman for Cosmopolitan felt that while she enjoyed Hinton's performance, Edwards was underutilized compared to earlier interns like "Izzie and George" and that it was "hard to make a character you only really get to play every few weeks feel like yours and I understand why [Jerrika is] moving on. She cited that spending her childhood in hospitals as the reason she had to get out of working in hospitals (she had sickle cell treatments as a child).

References

External links 
 Stephanie Edwards on IMDb

Grey's Anatomy characters
Fictional surgeons
Television characters introduced in 2012
Fictional African-American people
Fictional female doctors
American female characters in television